The Basketball Diaries is a 1978 memoir written by author and musician Jim Carroll. It is an edited collection of the diaries he kept between the ages of twelve and sixteen.  Set in New York City, they detail his daily life, sexual experiences, high school basketball career, poetry compositions, the counterculture movement, and especially his addiction to heroin, which began when he was 13.

The book was made into a film of the same name in 1995 starring Leonardo DiCaprio as Jim Carroll and Mark Wahlberg as Mickey.

Carroll followed up this memoir with a sequel of sorts called The Downtown Diaries which follows his relocation to California and his efforts to end his heroin addiction.

1978 non-fiction books
American memoirs
Memoirs adapted into films
Works originally published in The Paris Review
Non-fiction books about drugs
Books about musicians
Books about writers